Stevan Stojanović (9 January 1856 – 28 September 1914), known as Stevan Mokranjac was a Serbian composer and music educator. Born in Negotin in 1856, Mokranjac studied music in Belgrade, Munich, Rome and Leipzig while in his twenties. Later, he became the conductor of the Belgrade Choir Society and founder of the Serbian School of Music and the first Serbian string quartet, in which he played the cello. He left Belgrade at the beginning of World War I and moved to Skopje, where he died on 28 September 1914.

Often called the "father of Serbian music" and the "most important figure of Serbian musical romanticism", Mokranjac is well-regarded and much revered in Serbia. Following his death, the Serbian Music School was renamed the Mokranjac Music School in his honour. He has been featured on the country's paper currency and that of the Federal Republic of Yugoslavia. In 1964, the Mokranjac family home in Negotin was restored and turned into a museum and musical centre. Celebrations of Mokranjac's life, known as "Mokranjac days", have occurred annually in the town since 1965. In 1981, a large statue of Mokranjac was constructed in the yard of the Mokranjac family home to mark the 125th anniversary of his birth.

Biography

Stevan Stojanović was born on 9 January 1856 in the town of Negotin, Principality of Serbia. Close to the Serbian border with Romania and Bulgaria, Negotin was a small town of just over 3,000 inhabitants at the time of his birth. Stojanović earned the nickname "Mokranjac" after the village of Mokranje, where his ancestors were from. Mokranjac's father, a prosperous restaurant owner who in 1850 had built the house in which the Stojanović family lived, died two days before his son's birth. Growing up with his mother and three siblings, Mokranjac received his first violin at the age of ten. He spent most of his youth in Negotin, Zaječar and Belgrade.

In his twenties, he was subjected to conservative musical training and first studied in Belgrade.  He went on to study in Munich with Josef Rheinberger from 1880 to 1883, and in Rome with Alessandro Parisotti in 1884–1885. Afterwards, he studied for two years in the city of Leipzig under Salomon Jadassohn and Carl Reinecke.

In 1878, Mokranjac arranged a concert commemorating the twenty-fifth anniversary of the Belgrade Choir Society, titled "The History of Serbian Song". He and his family lived in their family home in Negotin until 1883. In 1887 Mokranjac made a permanent move to Belgrade, where he became the conductor of the Belgrade Choir Society, a position he would hold until his death. The choir was successful both in Serbia and abroad and under his leadership it became respected and well known throughout Central Europe and Russia because of its high performance standard and repertoire, which was made up of many Serbian folk songs, as well as pieces composed by Mokranjac himself. It toured Bulgaria, Croatia, Montenegro, Ottoman Turkey, and Russia. In 1899, the choir toured Berlin, Dresden, and Leipzig. During this time, Mokranjac married Marija, a member of the choir who was twenty years his junior. The couple had one son, Momčilo.

Mokranjac founded the Serbian School of Music in 1899, as well as the first Serbian string quartet, in which he played the cello. Although his most famous works date from the late 19th century, Mokranjac continued composing during the 1900s. In mid-1914, he left Belgrade and moved to Skopje to escape World War I. He is buried in the New Cemetery of Belgrade.

Compositions

Early in his career, Mokranjac recorded Serbian Orthodox church chants in staff notation. A gifted composer, he first published a book of church melodies in 1908, titled Octoechoes or "Eight Tones". Published in Belgrade, it became the basic textbook for students in Serbian Orthodox seminaries following World War I. Mokranjac's chants were unique because he removed their ornamental and microtonal elements and harmonized them, making them distinct from other Eastern Orthodox church chants. Consequently, chants written by Mokranjac were used more than those written by other composers. Older versions of church chants were suppressed or forgotten.

Later melodies, drawn from oral tradition, were published posthumously. Mokranjac also composed many pieces of sacred music in a polyphonic style similar to that of Italian Renaissance composer Giovanni Pierluigi da Palestrina. Travelling often to Levač and Kosovo to collect and record traditional melodies, Mokranjac played a significant role in promoting music from the rural areas of Serbia. A composer committed to choral music, he achieved this partly by his composition of fifteen choral suites to which he gave the name "Garlands", made up of a total of eighty-two songs composed from 1883 to 1913.

Mokranjac composed The Divine Liturgy of St. John Crysostom and Ivko's slava in 1901. In 1906, he created a mixed chorus version of The Glorification of Saint Sava, which was originally composed for a male chorus in 1893. In 1913, Mokranjac composed the eighty-second and final piece of "Garlands", titled Winter Days. He also composed numerous songs for children's choir.

His last and unfinished composition for a choir, based on the poem Zimnji dani by Jovan Jovanović Zmaj, was finished by Aleksandra Vrebalov and performed in 2015.

Legacy

Considered the "father of Serbian music" and the "most important figure of Serbian musical romanticism", Mokranjac is well-regarded and much revered in Serbia. His works are considered the corner stones of Serbian music theatre. Serbian Orthodox chants recorded by Mokranjac and other composers form the basis of most modern Serbian  church singing.

The Serbian Music School, which Mokranjac founded, was renamed the Mokranjac Music School after his death. He has been featured on the paper currency of both the Federal Republic of Yugoslavia and Serbia. In 1964, the Mokranjac family home in Negotin was restored and turned into a museum and musical centre. Celebrations of Mokranjac's life, known as "Mokranjac days", have occurred annually in the town since 1965. In 1981, a large statue of Mokranjac was constructed in the yard of the Mokranjac family home to mark the 125th anniversary of his birth.

Mokranjac was awarded Serbian Order of Saint Sava, Ottoman Order of Osmanieh, Montenegrin Order of Prince Danilo I and Bulgarian Order of Saint Alexander.

He is included in The 100 most prominent Serbs.

See also
 Kosta Manojlović
 Petar Krstić
 Miloje Milojević
 Stevan Hristić
 Isidor Bajić
 Stanislav Binički
 Davorin Jenko
 Jovan Đorđević
 Josif Marinković
 Kornelije Stanković

Notes

References

Books

Websites

 
 

1856 births
1914 deaths
19th-century classical composers
19th-century male musicians
20th-century classical composers
20th-century male musicians
Belgrade Higher School alumni
Burials at Belgrade New Cemetery
Classical composers of church music
Eastern Orthodox Christians from Serbia
Serbian ethnomusicologists
Male classical composers
Members of the Serbian Orthodox Church
People from Negotin
People from the Principality of Serbia
Romantic composers
Serbian composers
Serbian music history
Serbian musicologists